Liam and Me is a four-piece rock band from Philadelphia, Pennsylvania. The band creates "concise, melodic, rhythmic, emotional pop rock" and is made up of Matt O'Dowd on vocals and keyboard, Dan Larkin on guitar and vocals, Kevin McKenzie on bass, and Jon Briks on drums.

Liam and Me has over 31,000 fans online and nearly one million plays. Several of their songs have been featured in television programs including Oxygen's Campus Ladies, which used "Say It Out Loud," and The World Series, which used "Pretender". The band was also chosen to contribute a song to the Purevolume Holiday Sampler. Liam and Me has toured the United States and Canada and shared a stage with Kill Hannah, The White Tie Affair, The Spill Canvas, Ludo, Steel Train, Under the Influence of Giants, Young Love, PlayRadioPlay, Shiny Toy Guns, and The Sounds. They have also performed at numerous large festivals including The Bamboozle, V Festival, South by Southwest, CMJ and Warped Tour. Liam and Me was featured as the first track on a Music Saves Lives compilation alongside other notable artists like Relient K, Mae, Jack's Mannequin, and New Atlantic. The band has been featured in the Philadelphia City Paper, Spin, and All Access Magazine. A review in All Access described a performance as "ethereal keyboard hooks, catching guitar accompaniment, and luminous vocals, poetic lyrics, heartfelt harmonies, and an overall crisp sound". A Today Show survey listed Liam and Me as one of Today's viewers' favorite indie bands describing their songs as "undeniably catchy" and their show as "an outstanding live performance that is guaranteed to get everyone up and dancing". Their music video for "Say It Out Loud" has been featured on MTVU, MTV Online, and VH1 Online. Their forthcoming record was produced by Wired All Wrong (Hellogoodbye, White Tie Affair, Beck) and mixed by Mark Endert (Maroon 5, The Fray, Fiona Apple) and Kyle Black.

History
The band's genesis was in the form of a high school punk band called Mad Mardigan, founded by Dan Larkin. He recruited Kevin McKenzie to play bass who enlisted long-time friend Matt O'Dowd. The band members parted ways to attend universities in different geographical locations but continued to reunite over breaks from school to write and record. Eventually, their sound grew into a more mature rock, replacing their punk origins. In 2002, a new song won them a spot on the famous Warped Tour and the band began to refocus on music. After struggling to find a suitable name to accompany the new direction of the band, they decided one cold winter night to stand outside wearing only shorts and T-shirts until they had picked a name. After about thirty minutes of discussion, Liam and Me, an allusion to The Big Lebowski, was chosen, though their music makes no reference to the Coen brothers film. From there, Liam and Me continued to develop its sound, added keyboard to its arrangements, began playing a lot of shows, and eventually self-released a ten-song album entitled There's A Difference. The record sold out in about a month. In 2006, Liam and Me garnered attention from several major labels and influential indies including Virgin Records, Decaydance Records, Thrive Records, Atlantic Records, Columbia Records, Capitol Records, and Epic Records. Initially, they decided on Virgin but, as O'Dowd explains Virgin, “tried to put a clause in our contract allowing them to buy us out if they didn’t like the CD"  So, unwilling to take that risk after all of their hard work, they decided against it.  “It was a tough decision for us, but we went with a smaller label that would hopefully focus on us more as a band, not just an investment” explained Larkin. The band then spent several months in studios in Los Angeles working on the record and a release was scheduled for fall of 2007. Instead, the release was pushed back. Thrive no longer had enough money to provide the funds promised in the contract and, claiming bankruptcy, pushed the record back indefinitely. This led to a legal battle between the label and the band as the band sought to get its music back. Eventually, Liam and Me got their record back and have been working on completing the mixing and mastering in order to release it in the near future.

Discography
 There's A Difference
 Lives We Might Have Lived

References

External links
Next Big Sound
All Access
The Today Show
Phillyist
Bennett Hall Observer
Liam and Me Official Youtube
MTV Page
MTVU Page
VH1 Page

American pop rock music groups
Musical groups from Philadelphia